State Route 144 (SR 144) is a  state highway in Union County, Tennessee. It connects Hickory Star and Maynardville with Plainview.

Route description
SR 144 begins as Hickory Star Road in Hickory Star at an intersection with SR 170. The highway goes southeast and crosses over a ridge to enter Maynardville and have a short concurrency with SR 33/SR 61, just west of downtown. SR 144 then leaves Maynardville and continues southeast as Ailor Gap Road and crosses over another Ridge to come to an intersection with SR 370. SR 144 continues southeast to enter Plainview and come to an end at an intersection with SR 131 just west of town, where the road continues southeast as Corryton Road to Corryton.

Junction list

See also

References

144
Transportation in Union County, Tennessee